Mbaye Seck (born 27 November 1998) is a Senegalese football player. He plays for Serie D club ASD Brusaporto.

Club career
He made his Serie C debut for Giana Erminio on 27 August 2017 in a game against Pro Piacenza.

References

External links
 

1998 births
Footballers from Dakar
Living people
Senegalese footballers
Senegalese expatriate footballers
Association football defenders
Virtus Bergamo Alzano Seriate 1909 players
A.S. Giana Erminio players
Serie C players
Serie D players
Senegalese expatriate sportspeople in Italy
Expatriate footballers in Italy